Jessie Carney Smith (born September 24, 1930) is an American librarian and educator, formerly Dean of the Fisk University Library and Camille Cosby Distinguished Chair in the Humanities. She was the first African American to earn a Ph.D. degree in library science from the University of Illinois. She is also a scholar and author of research guides and reference books focusing on notable African-American people.

Early life 
Jessie Carney Smith was born on September 24, 1930, in Greensboro, North Carolina, to James Ampler and Vesona Bigelow Carney. Smith attended James B. Dudley High School in Greensboro. She graduated from North Carolina A&T State University with her B.S. degree in home economics in 1950. Smith received her M.A. degree in child development from Michigan State University in 1956, and her M.A.L.S. degree from the George Peabody College of Vanderbilt University in 1957.

Career 
Smith began working as an instructor and library cataloger at Tennessee State University in 1957. She enrolled in a Ph.D. program at the University of Illinois in 1960, and became the first African American to earn a Ph.D. degree in library science from the University of Illinois in 1964. Smith was hired as a professor of library science and the university library of Fisk University in Nashville, Tennessee, in 1965. Smith was appointed dean of the Fisk University library in 2010. She retired in 2020.

She has served as consultant to the U.S. Office for Civil Rights, the U.S. Office of Education, the National Endowment for the Humanities, and the Southern Association of Colleges and Schools. She was awarded Fisk University's Camille Cosby Distinguished Chair in the Humanities in 1992.

Smith has published numerous research guides and reference books, specifically exploring the gaps in scholarship around African-Americans. She has published three separate volumes of Notable Black American Women (in 1991, 1996, and 2003) and two separate volumes of Notable Black American Men (in 1999 and 2006). Her other books include Black Heroes of the Twentieth Century, Freedom Facts and Firsts: 400 Years of the African American Civil Rights Experience, and Black Firsts: 4000 Groundbreaking and Pioneering Historical Events, among others.

Legacy 
Smith is best known for her work as an African-American studies scholar, and has received a number of awards for her work in libraries and as an author. She was awarded the Martin Luther King Black Authors Award in 1982 and the National Women's Book Association Award in 1992. She received the Candace Award for excellence in education in 1992, and distinguished alumni awards from both the Peabody College of Vanderbilt University and the University of Illinois. Smith was named the Academic/Research Librarian of the Year from the Association of College and Research Libraries in 1985, and in 1997 Smith received the key to the city of Oak Ridge, Tennessee. In 2020, upon her retirement, Smith was granted the title of Librarian Emerita by Fisk University.

References

External links 
 Biography of Jessie Carney Smith from Contemporary Black Biography, 2005

People from Greensboro, North Carolina
African-American librarians
American librarians
American women librarians
African-American women writers
Black studies scholars
1930 births
Living people
21st-century African-American people
21st-century African-American women
20th-century African-American people
20th-century African-American women